Chander Parkash Rahi is a Punjabi writer who writes in English.

Life
The native town of Chander Parkash Rahi is Khanna, Punjab (India). At the time of partition of India (1947) he was a thirteen-and-a-half-year-old boy. After completing his studies he became a school teacher and taught English for 35 years in rural, semi-urban and urban areas. Later he settled in Patiala.

Books
Wounds of Partition — The Mourning and Other Stories 
The Journey of A School Teacher
Tenses and Grammatical Concepts in English
Punjab's Turbulant Times

References

Living people
Punjabi people
Writers from Punjab, India
Year of birth missing (living people)
Indian male writers